Haym Salomon (also Solomon; anglicized from Chaim Salomon; April 7, 1740 – January 6, 1785) was a Polish-born Jewish businessman and political financial broker who assisted the Superintendent of Finance, English-born Robert Morris, as the prime financier of the rebel American side during the American Revolutionary War against Great Britain.

Having immigrated to New York City from Poland, Salomon aided the Continental Army during the period of the American Revolution and helped convert French loans into ready cash by selling bills of exchange for Morris, the superintendent of finance. He also brokered large donations, and donated his entire fortune, to the American Revolutionary army and various Founding Fathers of the United States of America.

Early life and education
Haym Salomon was born in 1740 in Leszno, Poland, to a Sephardic Jewish family descended from Spanish and Portuguese Jews who gradually migrated to Poland following Ferdinand and Isabella's expulsion of the Jews from Spain in 1492. Although most Jews in Central and Eastern Europe spoke Yiddish (Judeo-German), it is alleged that because Salomon left Poland with his family while still young, he could not read and write Yiddish. (Spanish Jews, or Sephardim, typically spoke Ladino, a language based on Hebrew and Spanish, rather than Yiddish.) In his youth, he studied Hebrew.

During his adult travels in Western Europe, Salomon acquired a knowledge of finance and fluency in some of the languages of the day. He returned to Poland in 1770 but left for England two years later in the wake of the Polish partition. In 1775, he immigrated to New York City, where he established himself as a financial broker for merchants engaged in overseas trade.

Revolutionary activity

Sympathizing with the Patriot cause, Salomon joined the New York branch of the Sons of Liberty. In September 1776, he was arrested as a spy. The British pardoned him, but detained him for 18 months on a British boat as an interpreter for Hessian soldiers, German troops employed by the British. Salomon used his position to help prisoners of war from the Continental Army escape, encouraged the Hessians to desert the war effort, and collaborated with Hercules Mulligan and Cato to carry out other espionage activities. In 1778 Salomon was arrested again, convicted of espionage, and sentenced to death. Again, he escaped, making his way with his family to the revolutionary capital in Philadelphia.

Financing of the American Revolutionary War
Once resettled, Salomon resumed his activities as a broker. He became the agent to the French consul as well as the paymaster for the French forces in North America. In 1781, he began working extensively with Robert Morris, the newly appointed Superintendent for Finance for the Thirteen Colonies.

From the period of 1781–1784, records show Salomon's fundraising and personal lending helped provide over $650,000 (approximately over $16 million in 2021 dollars) in financing to General George Washington in his war effort. His most meaningful financial contribution, however, came immediately prior to the Siege of Yorktown.

In August 1781, the Continental Army trapped Lieutenant General Charles Cornwallis in the Virginia coastal town of Yorktown. George Washington and the main army, and Count de Rochambeau with his French army, decided to march from the Hudson Highlands to Yorktown and deliver the final blow. But Washington's war chest was completely empty, as was that of Congress. Without food, uniforms and supplies, Washington's troops were close to mutiny.

Washington determined that he needed at least $20,000 to finance the campaign. When Morris told him there were no funds and no credit available, Washington said: "Send for Haym Salomon". Salomon raised $20,000, through the sale of bills of exchange. With that contribution, Washington conducted the Yorktown campaign, which proved to be the final battle of the Revolution.

Salomon brokered the sale of a majority of the war aid from France and the Dutch Republic, selling bills of exchange to American merchants. Salomon also personally supported various members of the Continental Congress during their stay in Philadelphia, including James Madison and James Wilson. He requested below-market interest rates, and he never asked for repayment.

Salomon is believed to have granted outright bequests to men that he thought were unsung heroes of the revolution who had become impoverished during the war. One example is Bodo Otto, a senior surgeon in the continental army. Otto joined the army at the age of 65 and served for the entire war. Among other things, he established the hospital at Valley Forge, where he often used his own funds to purchase medical supplies. Due to Salomon's bequest, Otto was able to rebuild his medical practice in Reading, Pennsylvania, at war's end.

The Treaty of Paris, signed on September 3, 1783, ended the Revolutionary War but not the financial problems of the newly established nation. America's war debt to France was never properly repaid, which was part of the cascade of events leading to the French Revolution.

Jewish community

Salomon was involved in Jewish community affairs, being a member of Congregation Mikveh Israel in Philadelphia, and in 1782 made the largest individual donation toward the construction of its main building. In 1783, Salomon was among the prominent Jews involved in the successful effort to have the Pennsylvania Council of Censors remove the religious test oath required for office-holding under the State Constitution. These test laws were originally written to disenfranchise the Quaker majority (Quakers objected to taking oaths at all), but many were caught up in this anti-democratic ploy. It was Salomon's old friend Robert Morris who actually introduced legislation to end the test laws in Pennsylvania. In 1784, Salomon answered antisemitic slander in the press by stating: "I am a Jew; it is my own nation; I do not despair that we shall obtain every other privilege that we aspire to enjoy along with our fellow-citizens."

Freemasonry 
Like Washington and many prominent men associated with the American revolution, Salomon was a member of the Masonic fraternity. He received his first two degrees in Philadelphia's Lodge No. 2, Ancient York Rite in 1764. After the war, his Master Mason degree was conferred in 1784 (possibly in Maryland Lodge 27), the year before his death.

Death
The financier died suddenly and in poverty on January 8, 1785, in Philadelphia. Due to the failure of governments and private lenders to repay the debt incurred by the war, his family was left penniless at his death at age 44. The hundreds of thousands of dollars of Continental debt Salomon bought with his own fortune were worth only about 10 cents on the dollar when he died.

His obituary in the Independent Gazetteer read, "Thursday, last, expired, after a lingering illness, Mr. Haym Salomon, an eminent broker of this city, was a native of Poland, and of the Hebrew nation. He was remarkable for his skill and integrity in his profession, and for his generous and humane deportment. His remains were yesterday deposited in the burial ground of the synagogue of this city."

Legacy

The grave site of Haym Salomon is located in the Mikveh Israel Cemetery in Philadelphia. Though it is unmarked, there are two plaque memorials. The east wall has a marble tablet that was installed by his great-grandson, William Salomon, and a granite memorial is set inside the cemetery gate. In 1980, the Haym Salomon Lodge #663 of the fraternal organization B'rith Sholom sponsored a memorial in the Mikveh Israel Cemetery. A blue ribbon panel and committee, including Robert S. Whitman, Sidney Bruskin and Marvin Abrams, all lodge past presidents; and Philadelphia residents, arranged for the renovation of the walls and walkways of the cemetery. They then arranged for and oversaw the installation of a large, engraved memorial marker of Barre Granite just inside the cemetery gates, inscribed "An American Patriot". A memorial bronze marker with an American flag was installed by Robert S. Whitman, marking the dedicated space for the American patriot.

Commemoration

There is a legend that during the design process of the Great Seal, Washington asked what compensation Salomon wanted in return for his financial contributions to the American Revolutionary War. He replied that "he wanted nothing for himself but that he wanted something for his people". While there is no evidence, there is a theory that the 13 stars representing the colonies on the seal were arranged in the shape of the Star of David in commemoration of Solomon's contributions. This appears to have little basis in fact, however, although it is oft-repeated.

 In 1893, a bill was presented before the 52nd United States Congress ordering a gold medal be struck in recognition of Salomon's contributions to the United States.
 In 1939, Warner Brothers released Sons of Liberty, a short film starring Claude Rains as Salomon.
 In 1941, the writer Howard Fast wrote a book Haym Salomon, Son of Liberty. That same year, the Heald Square Monument, a sculpture designed by Lorado Taft was erected at Wacker Drive and Wabash Avenue in downtown Chicago. Taft began the work but died in 1936. It was completed by his associate, Leonard Crunelle. The monument depicts George Washington flanked by Salomon and Robert Morris and grasping hands with both men.
 In 1946, a memorial statue was erected to Salomon at Hollenbeck Park in Los Angeles. The statue was rededicated in 2008 at Pan-Pacific Park in the Fairfax District, where it can be found on the corner of Gardner and Third Street.
 In 1975, the United States Postal Service issued a commemorative stamp honoring Haym Salomon for his contributions to the cause of the American Revolution. This stamp, like others in the "Contributors to the Cause" series, was printed on the front and the back. On the glue side of the stamp, the following words were printed in pale green ink: "Financial Hero – Businessman and broker Haym Salomon was responsible for raising most of the money needed to finance the American Revolution and later to save the new nation from collapse".
 The Congressional Record of March 25, 1975 reads:

 In 1941, Howard Fast wrote a novel, Haym Salomon, Son of Liberty, around Saloman's life.
 In World War II, the United States liberty ship SS Haym Salomon was named in his honor. The ship was launched on May 17, 1943. It was sold for private use in 1947 and scrapped in 1971.
 The Haym Salomon Nursing Home in Brooklyn, New York, is named in his honor.
 Haym Salomon Square is located Kew Gardens Hills, Queens, New York City.
 Haym Salomon Memorial Park in Frazer, Pennsylvania, is a Jewish cemetery in suburban Philadelphia. It is the final resting place of musician Jim Croce.
 The Haym Salomon Center is a nonprofit organization located in Northbrook, Illinois, that advocates for pro-Western, pro-democracy values.

See also

References

Further reading
 Amler, Jane Frances. Haym Salomon: Patriot Banker of the American Revolution. .
 Arcuri, James. For God and Country: A Spy and A Patriot. .
 Berry, Steve. The Patriot Threat. ISBN 978-1-250-05623-8.
 Hart, Charles Spencer. General Washington's Son of Israel and Other Forgotten Heroes of History. Literary Licensing, LLC. 2013. .
 Levine, Rabbi Menachem. The Jew who Saved America in the Revolutionary War
 Klinger, Jerry. "Haym Solomon", Jewish American Society for Historic Preservation.
 Lyons, Renee Critcher. Foreign-Born American Patriots: Sixteen Volunteer Leaders in the Revolutionary War. North Carolina: McFarland Publishing. 2013. .
 Moran, Donald M. Haym Salomon –The Revolution's Indispensable Financial Genius. Revolutionary War Archives, Sons of Liberty Chapter.
 Peters, Madison C.  New York: The Trow Press, 1911. .
 Russell, Charles Edward. Haym Salomon and the Revolution. .
 Schwartz, Laurens R. Jews and the American Revolution: Haym Salomon and Others. Jefferson, North Carolina: McFarland & Co., 1987. .
 Wiernik, Peter. . New York: Jewish Press Publishing Company, 1912.

External links

Extensive Biography at RealClearHistory.com.

Guide to the Haym Salomon (1740-1785) Collection at the American Jewish Historical Society, New York.

1740 births
1785 deaths
18th-century American businesspeople
Polish emigrants to the United States
American Sephardic Jews
Spanish and Portuguese Jews
Financiers of the American Revolution
Businesspeople from Philadelphia
Polish people of the American Revolution
American people of Polish-Jewish descent
People of colonial Pennsylvania
Political activists from Pennsylvania
People of Pennsylvania in the American Revolution
People of New York (state) in the American Revolution
Jewish-American military history
People from Leszno
Polish Sephardi Jews